QLF may refer to:

Quebec-Labrador Foundation
Quebec Liberation Front
Queens Liberation Front
Query level feature